Mansfield station may refer to:

Mansfield station (MBTA), in Mansfield, Massachusetts, United States
Mansfield railway station, Nottinghamshire, in Mansfield, Nottinghamshire, England
Mansfield Central railway station, former station in Mansfield, Nottinghamshire, England
Mansfield railway station, Victoria, former station in Mansfield, Victoria, Australia
Mansfield Woodhouse railway station, Nottinghamshire, England

See also
Mansfield (disambiguation)